Elaine Emmanual is a Jamaican former cricketer. She made her Women's One Day International debut during the 1973 Women's Cricket World Cup against Young England in a group stage match where fellow Jamaican players Leila Williams, Madge Stewart, Dorrett Davis, Loretta McIntosh, Evelyn Bogle and Yvonne Oldfield also made their maiden international appearance in the inaugural Women's Cricket World Cup.

References

External links 
 

Possibly living people
Date of birth missing (living people)
Jamaican women cricketers
West Indian women cricketers